Novonikolayevka is a village in Chüy Region of Kyrgyzstan. It is part of the Jayyl District. Its population was 7,964 in 2021.

Population

References

Populated places in Chüy Region